Kari Makkonen (born January 20, 1955) is a Finnish retired professional ice hockey player who played in the SM-liiga for Ässät and in the National Hockey League for the Edmonton Oilers

Playing career
Makkonen played his entire SM-liiga career for Pori based team Ässät, playing from 1974 until 1991. Makkonen was drafted 194th overall in the 1975 NHL Amateur Draft by the New York Islanders and was also drafted 127st by the Indianapolis Racers in the 1975 WHA Amateur Draft and 42nd by the Phoenix Roadrunners in the 1976 WHA Amateur Draft, though he elected to remain in Finland. Makkonen would eventually make the move to North America in 1979, where he signed for the Edmonton Oilers for the 1979-80 NHL season. He would play just nine games for Edmonton however, scoring two goals and two assists. He also played sixteen games in the Central Hockey League for the Houston Apollos, scoring five goals and five assists. It would be Makkonen's only season in North America as he would return to Ässät the following year.

Makkonen retired from playing in 1991 and He was inducted into the Finnish Hockey Hall of Fame in 1995.

Coaching career
Makkonen coached his first seasons as coach in the Finnish Lower Divisions for Seinäjoki HT and Kotkan Titaanit.

Makkonen's first SM-liiga coaching job came when he coached Ässät for a short period. Makkonen also was employed by Lukko for some time before he was employed by Tappara as an assistant coach for Jukka Rautakorpi

Makkonen was the assistant coach in Tappara for several years, winning the SM-liiga Championships in 2003 and finishing second in 2001 and 2002.

Makkonen was in 2007-09 the head coach of Mestis team Jukurit, which is a top contender in the second highest level of ice hockey in Finland.

Career statistics

Regular season and playoffs

International

External links
 Finnish Hockey Hall of Fame bio

1955 births
Living people
Ässät players
Edmonton Oilers players
Finnish ice hockey left wingers
Houston Apollos players
Indianapolis Racers draft picks
New York Islanders draft picks
People from Harjavalta
Phoenix Roadrunners draft picks
Ässät coaches
Sportspeople from Satakunta